Mission: Impossible – Operation Surma is an action-adventure stealth  video game developed by Paradigm Entertainment and published by Atari for Game Boy Advance, Xbox, PlayStation 2 and GameCube. The game takes place between Mission: Impossible 2 and Mission: Impossible III.

Plot
IMF operative Ethan Hunt is on a scuba diving mission to explore a shipwreck off the coast of the Black Sea. Once he finishes observing, he encounters two other IMF agents, one of whom shoots a harpoon at the ship to give Ethan his next mission. As explained, Ethan will have to escort Mikail Marcou, a former advisor of Yugaria's current dictator, Simon Algo, and acquire a mini disk from Algo which contains vital information on Algo's operations.

Ethan arrives at the Yugarian Ministry of Information, and despite a few missteps from a new member of the IMF team, Jasmine Curry, the mission runs smoothly and Ethan makes contact with Marcou. Marcou, however, tells him when he is safely in England, the disk will belong to IMF. The plan goes south, as Marcou is shot and killed by Vasyl Berkut, the head of the Yugarian Secret Service. Ethan takes possession of the disk and pursues Berkut. Berkut escapes, then Luther Stickell and Billy Baird extract Ethan at the last minute to evade capture.

Making his way to Los Muertos Laboratories, Ethan disguises himself as a security guard to gain access to the lower levels of the facility, though it was short lived. He enters the computer core and is forced to hide when Jong Ho Li, a contractor and ally to Algo, and Sofia Ivanescu, a software engineer, come to download software onto the core. Once they leave, Ethan hacks the core and Luther reveals Los Muertos' plan to use three strains of neurodioxin. He requests Ethan and new IMF agent George Spelvin (disguising himself as a scientist) abort the mission, but Ethan refuses and destroys the biological weapons. But this sets off an alarm, causing Jong Ho to accuse Sofia of being a spy. He places bombs throughout the facility to cover his tracks, but Ethan disarms them. Outside, Sofia sabotages a helicopter, leaving Jong Ho and his men to Ethan's disposal. In a shootout, Ethan kills Jong Ho and follows Sofia to Yugaria.

Sneaking back in Yugaria's Ministry of Information, Ethan learns of ICEWORM, a deadly computer virus capable of breaking through any type of security system. Unable to access ICEWORM's codes, Berkut orders his men to apprehend Sofia to obtain the codes, inadvertently revealing to an overhearing Ethan that Sofia's father, Nicholas Ivanescu (long thought dead) is still alive, but in league with Algo. Using the electronic wasp and a sniper pistol, Ethan protects Sofia from Berkut's men, but as he tries to explain himself to her, she mistakes him for being Berkut's loyal and runs off. Almost falling to her death, and Ethan saves her. Ethan vows to protect Sofia and she accepts.

Ethan, Sofia, Jasmine, and Spelvin travel to Sansara (a notorious prison off the North African coast) to destroy the remains of the biological weapons that were transported from Los Muertos. Jasmine and Spelvin meet with Berkut and enter the "Rat Trap", with Ethan following the three. Meanwhile, Sofia talks with Algo about the use of ICEWORM, with Sofia revealing that using the virus is a means to avenge her father's apparent death at the hands of Yugaria's previous corrupt government. Ethan finds Algo's chief bioscientist in solitary confinement, who is revealed to be Nicholas. He agrees to help Ethan destroy the neurodioxin, and the latter takes Sofia to the data center so she can help him advance to the lab. Knocking out Berkut with the wasp, Ethan impersonates him and disables the neurodioxin. Meeting with Nicholas, Ethan witnesses Algo kill Spelvin, injure Jasmine, and take Sofia hostage through his microcamera. He plants explosives in the lab, and tells Nicholas to escape. Ethan covers Jasmine as she makes her escape. Unable to find Sofia nor Algo, Ethan escapes thanks to Billy coming back for Ethan.

Learning that Algo is using a plane as a mobile headquarters, Ethan skydives and activates a jetpack to get onto the plane. On board, Algo betrays and kills Berkut by using an experimental rocket launcher. Ethan plants explosives on each wing of the plane. Ethan finds Sofia in the cabin, but Algo surprises him. As he prepares to kill her, Sofia kicks him out of the plane, but not before he grabs her and she falls. Ethan pursues the two, grabbing a parachute from one of Algo's men. He rescues Sofia, and sees Algo landed in the SURMA Building, a company he runs as a front for his terrorist activities.

Ethan and Sofia land on the SURMA Building, where Algo meets them. As Sofia runs away to safety, Ethan hunts down Algo throughout the rooftop. The two meet for a final confrontation, where Algo uses an experimental invisibility device to his advantage. Despite this, Ethan disrupts the technology and kills Algo.

Weeks after the incident, Ethan and Sofia are on a private cruise near Aruba. As Sofia says her dealings with technology are over, she and Ethan kiss, then go scuba diving.

Voice cast
Tom Cruise, who plays Ethan Hunt in the Mission: Impossible films, does not lend his likeness or voice to the character in the game. Veteran voice actor Steve Blum replaces him. Ving Rhames and John Polson reprise their roles of Luther Stickell and Billy Baird from Mission: Impossible 2 respectively.

Steve Blum as Ethan Hunt
Ving Rhames as Luther Stickell
John Polson as Billy Baird
Melinda Clarke as Sofia Ivanescu
Kirk Thornton as Simon Algo, George Spelvin
Mona Marshall as Jasmine Curry
Steve Bulen as Director Swanbeck, Vasyl Berkut
Rob Monroe as Additional Voices

Reception

The game received "mixed or average reviews" on all platforms except the Game Boy Advance version, which received "generally unfavorable reviews", according to video game review aggregator Metacritic. In Japan, Famitsu gave the GameCube and PlayStation 2 versions a score of all four sevens for a total of 28 out of 40.

References

External links

2003 video games
Action-adventure games
Atari games
Game Boy Advance games
GameCube games
Mission: Impossible video games
Video games based on adaptations
PlayStation 2 games
Stealth video games
Spy video games
Video games about terrorism
Video games developed in the United States
Xbox games
Paradigm Entertainment games
Single-player video games